is a former Japanese football player.

Playing career
Mizuki was born in Miyazaki Prefecture on August 1, 1974. After graduating from high school, he joined Kashima Antlers in 1993. Although he was center back, he could not play at all in the match behind Yutaka Akita and Ryosuke Okuno until 1997. He debuted in 1998 and played several matches. In 1999, he moved to Avispa Fukuoka and he played many matches. However he could hardly play in the match in 2000. In 2001, he moved to his local club Honda Lock in Regional Leagues. He retired end of 2002 season.

Club statistics

References

External links

awx.jp

1974 births
Living people
Association football people from Miyazaki Prefecture
Japanese footballers
J1 League players
Kashima Antlers players
Avispa Fukuoka players
Honda Lock SC players
Association football defenders